Ivanovka is a rural locality (a village) in Karlamansky Selsoviet, Karmaskalinsky District, Bashkortostan, Russia. The population was 25 as of 2010. There is one street.

Geography 
Ivanovka is located 13 km southeast of Karmaskaly (the district's administrative centre) by road. Sharipkulovo is the nearest rural locality.

References 

Rural localities in Karmaskalinsky District